Kirkland was a sidewheel steamboat that ran on Lake Washington from 1888 to 1898.

Career
Kirkland was built in 1888 by T.W. Lake for the Jackson Street Cable Railway Company.  Once complete, Kirkland was placed on the Juanita– Kirkland–Houghton–Leschi Park route.  Kirkland was considered the prestige vessel on Lake Washington at the time it was built.  In 1889 Kirkland carried the U.S. Naval Commission on a tour of the lake when they were considering whether a shipping canal was possible.  1891 Kirkland conveyed President Benjamin Harrison around the lake when he came to Seattle.

Disposition
In 1898 Kirkland was dismantled, converted to a barge and sent north to Alaska.

Notes

References 
 Kline, M.S., and Bayless, G.A., Ferryboats -- A legend on Puget Sound, Bayless Books, Seattle, WA 1983 
 Newell, Gordon R., ed., H.W. McCurdy Marine History of the Pacific Northwest,  Superior Publishing Co., Seattle, WA (1966)
 Newell, Gordon R., Ships of the Inland Sea, Superior Publishing Co., Seattle, WA (2nd Ed. 1960)

1888 ships
Steamboats of Washington (state)
Ships built in Washington (state)
Sidewheel steamboats of Washington (state)